"Time Space EP" is the 27th single by the Japanese singer and voice actress Nana Mizuki, released on June 6, 2012, by King Records.

Track listing 
 "Metro Baroque"
Lyrics: Nana Mizuki
Composition: Yashikin
Arrangement: Masato Nakayama (Elements Garden)
Theme song for anime movie Blood-C: The Last Dark
 "Party! Party!"
Lyrics: Sayuri Katayama
Composition, arrangement: Tajiri Tomoyuki
TBS TV show "Rank Okoku" opening theme for June and July
 
Lyrics: Yūmao
Composition: Eriko Yoshiki
Arrangement: Jun Suyama
CM theme song for Meiji Kajuu Gumi Megumi to Taiyou II
 "One"
Lyrics: Nana Mizuki
Composition: Hidekazu Uchiike
Arrangement: Hitoshi Fujima (Elements Garden)
Ending theme for NHK-BS Premium TV show Animal Wonder

Charts
Oricon Sales Chart (Japan)

References

2012 EPs
Nana Mizuki albums